Juan de Pareja (c. 1606 in Antequera – 1670 in Madrid) was a Spanish painter and slave, born in Antequera, near Málaga, Spain. He is known primarily as a member of the household and workshop of painter Diego Velázquez, who freed him in 1650. His 1661 work The Calling of Saint Matthew (sometimes also referred to as The Vocation of Saint Matthew) is on display at the Museo del Prado in Madrid, Spain.

Biography
Juan de Pareja was a Spaniard born into slavery in Southern Spain, probably in Antequera in Malaga province around 1610. Little is known on his background although Antonio Palomino describes him as a morisco (convert from Islam), being "of mixed parentage and unusual color."

The first known reference to Juan Pareja as a painter is in a letter addressed to Pedro Galindo, attorney of the city of Seville, written on 12 May 1630, in which Juan de Pareja requests permission to move to Madrid in order to continue his studies together with his brother Jusepe. The authenticity of this document is questioned since within it he claims to be a free man and does not once mention Velázquez.

It is unknown at what time he began serving Diego Velázquez. In 1642 he signed as a witness in a power of attorney for Velázquez in a lawsuit against scribes in the criminal court. He was also a witness in October and December 1647, for two other powers of attorney to manage his assets in Seville granted by Velázquez and his wife Juana Pacheco. He would again sign a similar document in 1653 for Francisca Velázquez, daughter of the painter.

In 1649 he accompanied Velázquez on his second trip to Italy. This is where Velázquez painted his famous painting "Portrait of Juan de Pareja", currently in the Metropolitan Museum of Art of New York. The painting was exposed in the Pantheon of Rome in March 1650 during the festivities in honor of the Patron of the Virtuosos of the Pantheon, which Velázquez had recently joined. On 23 November, while still in Rome, Velázquez granted him a letter of freedom, which would come into effect after four years on the condition that he did not escape or commit any criminal act in that period. The document of his manumission, discovered by Jennifer Montagu, is held in the Archivio di Stato in Rome.

From then on until his death in Madrid he worked as an independent painter, demonstrating knowledge acquired in Velazquez's workshop, where he likely had wider responsibilities than Palomino suggests, as well as his knowledge of various other Spanish and Italian painters.

In fiction
 In 1965, Elizabeth Borton de Treviño published a fictionalized autobiography entitled I, Juan de Pareja, that presents imagined details into the lives of both painters.

Works
Portrait of Agustín Moreto (1648–53), oil on canvas, Lazaro Galdiano Foundation, Madrid, Spain
Portrait of a Monk (1651), oil on canvas, Hermitage Museum, Saint Petersburg, Russia
The Flight into Egypt (1658), John and Mable Ringling Museum of Art, Sarasota, Florida
The Calling of Saint Matthew (also known as The Vocation of Saint Matthew) (1661), oil on canvas, Museo del Prado, Madrid, Spain
Saints John the Evangelist and Orontius, Augustine Collection, Madrid, Spain
The Lady of Guadalupe, Augustine Collection, Madrid, Spain
Portrait of the Architect José Ratés Dalmau, oil on canvas (116 x 97 cm), Museu de Belles Arts de València, Spain
Portrait of Philip IV, King of Spain (c.1656), oil on canvas, Columbia Museum of Art, United States
El bautismo de Cristo (1667), Museo de Huesca/Museo del Prado, Huesca, Spain

Works depicting Pareja
Portrait of Juan de Pareja (1648), by Diego Vélazquez, Metropolitan Museum of Art, United States
Portrait of Juan de Pareja Repairing a Mandolin String (1960), by Salvador Dalí, Minneapolis Institute of Arts, United States
The Calling of Saint Matthew by Juan de Pareja, who painted himself as the leftmost figure (1661), oil on canvas, Museo del Prado, Madrid, Spain

Gallery

See also
Representation of slavery in European art
List of slaves

Notes

Sources

 (Juvenile novel.)

External links
Juan de Pareja on artcyclopedia
Juan de Pareja at the Museo del Prado. 

1606 births
1670 deaths
People from Antequera
17th-century Spanish painters
Spanish male painters
Spanish people of African descent
Spanish slaves
17th-century slaves
Spanish portrait painters